Henanfu or Henan Prefecture, also known as Luoyang, was a fu (superior prefecture) in imperial China in modern Henan, China, centering on modern Luoyang. It existed (intermittently) from 713 to 1913. During the Later Tang dynasty (923–937) it was the national capital. For most of the Tang dynasty (before 907) it was known as the "Eastern Capital", and during the Northern Song dynasty (960–1127) it was known as the "Western Capital". From 1127 to 1234 the Jurchen conquerors named it Jinchang Prefecture, also known as "Central Capital". For these reasons Henan Prefecture was also colloquially called Luojing (洛京, "Luo Capital").

The modern province Henan retains its name.

References

 
 
 

1913 disestablishments in Asia
Prefectures of the Tang dynasty
Prefectures of the Song dynasty
Prefectures of the Yuan dynasty
Prefectures of the Ming dynasty
Prefectures of the Qing dynasty
Luoyang
Former prefectures in Henan